Alexandre Frota de Andrade (born October 14, 1963) is a Brazilian politician and a former model and porn star. A former member of the Social Liberal Party (PSL), Frota was elected Federal Deputy by the state of São Paulo in the 2018 general elections.

Career

Acting career 
His acting career begin in various telenovelas on the Globo TV Network (Rede Globo) and in Brazilian films.

He participated on the Brazilian TV reality show "House of Artists" (Casa dos Artistas) on the SBT network, along with  Brazilian rock musician Supla. He also appeared in the "Celebrity Farm" (Quinta das Celebridades) reality show in Portugal where he reached second place, first place being awarded to the controversial José Castelo Branco. Both of these shows were variations on the Big Brother theme. While in Portugal Alexandre Frota appeared in the theatrical spectacle Sex Fever. Later he appeared in another TV reality show  "First Company Primeira Companhia, which took the form of a military  barracks and again José Castelo Branco participated.

Sports 

Frota has been a practitioner of Brazilian Jiu-Jitsu since 1990 and in 2010 he became the face for a São Paulo project to draw children to the sport. He has a win over fellow actor André Segatti at Oscar de Jiu-Jitsu II tournament in 1998.

In March 2013, it was announced that Frota was drafted to Corinthians Steamrollers, a move mainly seen to serve as publicity for the team. Frota asserted that he was interested in American football since he was 25 but couldn't find the opportunity to practice.

Pornographic films 
In 2004, Frota directed the pornographic film A Boneca da Casa launching the pornographic career of transgender Casa dos Artistas reality show participant Bianca Soares. Starting from 2004 to 2008, he appeared in a series of pornographic films for Brasileirinhas, performing with actresses such as Chloe Jones and Bianca Soares and retired after 00Frota - O Homem da Pistola de Ouro, a porn parody of The Man with the Golden Gun for Sexxxy. In a 2008 interview, he concluded that he saw his pornographic film career as the biggest mistake in his life.

Personal life 
Frota was married to telenovela actresses Cláudia Raia (1986 - 1989) and model Andréa Oliveira (1995-1995) although this second marriage lasted only 33 days. Frota married fitness model and dancer Fabiana Rodrigues in 2011. He has a son named Mayã (b. 1998) from a former relationship with Samantha Lima Gondim.

Political career 

Alexandre Frota has been politically active, having, according to him, founded the Free Brazil Movement (this fact is questioned in the courts). He has been also involved with the "Non-partisan School" movement.

In May 2016, he filed a petition for impeachment against Dilma Rousseff, and supported the president's impeachment.

In May 2018, he supported the strike by truck drivers in Brazil.

Frota was elected federal deputy from the state of São Paulo in the 2018 Brazilian general elections by Social Liberal Party (PSL).

After disrupting his support for President Jair Bolsonaro and abstaining himself from the second round of the voting for the pension reform, the national directory decided to expel him in August 2019, as confirmed by the party's president and also federal deputy, Luciano Bivar.

On August 16, 2019 Frota joined the Brazilian Social Democracy Party (PSDB) at the invitation of the Governor of São Paulo, João Doria.

Frota announced his campaign for President of the Chamber of Deputies in the 2021 election promising to open Bolsonaro impeachment trial if elected. However, he resigned and didn't register his application on the day.

Career in cinema
As an actor
 1984: Os Bons Tempos Voltaram: Vamos Gozar Outra Vez
 1985: The Adventures of Sergio Mallandro
 2004: Obsessão
 2004: A Bela e o Prisioneiro
 2004: Sexo, Suor e Samba
 2005: 11 Mulheres e Muito Pó
 2005: Invasão de Privacidade
 2006: Anal Total 10
 2006: Garoto de Programa
 2007: Na Teia do Sexo
 2007: A Proibida do Sexo e a Gueixa do Funk
 2007: Frota, Mônica e Sousa
 2007: Especial de Natal do Frota
 2007: Invadindo a Retaguarda
 2008: Carnaval do Frota
 2008: United Colors of Celebrities
 2008: Sem Limite
 2008: Puro Desejo
 2009: Carnaval do Frota
 2009: 00 Frota: O Homem da Pistola de Ouro
 2009: A Última Foda de Frota no Pornô

As a director
 2004: A Boneca da Casa

Career in television
As an actor
1984 - Livre para Voar - Cecílio
1985 - Roque Santeiro - Luizão
1987 - Sassaricando - Apolo
1988 - Chapadão do Bugre - Estevãozinho
1989 - Olho por Olho - Rico
1989 - Top Model  - Raul
1990 - Boca do Lixo - Tomás
1991 - O Sorriso do Lagarto - Tavinho
1992 - Perigosas Peruas - Jaú
1995 - Cara e Coroa - Boca
1995 - Malhação - Pavão
1997 - Olho da Terra' - Marcelo
1997 - Por Amor e Ódio - Santiago
1999 - Malhação - Robson
2002 - Marisol - Mário Soares
2004 - Turma do Gueto - Nenê/Kadu
2006 - Mandrake - Jorginho

Reality shows and other productions
2001 - Casa dos Artistas - Himself
2004 - Quinta das Celebridades - Himself
2005 - Primeira Companhia - Himself
2007 - O Melhor do Brasil - Enganador
2007 - Show do Tom - Capitão Monumento
2011 - A Praça é Nossa - Robin

As a director
2008 - Hoje em Dia2009 - A Fazenda2010 - Legendários''

References

External links

 
 
 Alexandre Frota in Celebriton (biographical database)

1963 births
Living people
Male actors from Rio de Janeiro (city)
Republican Party of the Social Order politicians
Brazilian male stage actors
Brazilian male telenovela actors
Brazilian male film actors
Brazilian male models
Brazilian male pornographic film actors
Brazilian practitioners of Brazilian jiu-jitsu
Brazilian anti-communists